Les Esprits Animaux is a Netherlands-based baroque band created in 2009. The group is devoted to the historically informed performance of baroque music. The ensemble is named after a philosophical term used in the baroque period which defines a certain kind of “subtle stream” that runs through the bodies of human beings and is able to affect the passions of the soul.

Since 2010, Les Esprits Animaux are in residency in the Festival d’Ambronay. For three consecutive years, the group has been invited to concert series in the Kerkconcerts in 't Woudt in the Netherlands. In 2011, the Fundación “La Caixa” selected Les Esprits Animaux to perform in several cities in Spain within the framework of Festival Antiqva, a part of the 34th edition of the Festival de Música Antigua de Barcelona. The band has also played in the Fringe (2010) and Fabulous Fringe 2011 in Utrecht, MA Fringe Festival 2011 in Bruges, Laus Polyphoniae 2011 (AMUZ) in Antwerp, “Göttinger Reihe Historischer Musik“ competition in 2012 in Göttingen and Ghent Festival 2012. Les Esprits Animaux was selected as “Promising ensemble 2011” in the International Young Artists Platform in Antwerp. Other past projects included the Day of “La Petite Bande” in Leuven, concerts in the European Parliament in Brussels representing Ambronay as European Culture Ambassador 2011. After having recorded its first CD for Ambronay Éditions (Harmonia Mundi) with a programme dedicated to G. Ph. Telemann in 2011, the ensemble recorded its second CD in 2013 with a programme entitled “Transfigurations” for the same label. Les Esprits Animaux has been awarded a Young Ensembles Residency at the Centre Culturel de Rencontre d'Ambronay. The ensemble won the International van Wassenaar Competition Utrecht in 2016.

Discography
 Georg Philipp Telemann (1681–1767) A Journey through Literature - Ambronay Éditions AMY302
 Bach, Corrette, Geminiani.. Transfigurations - Ambronay Éditions AMY039

References

External links
Official website
Facebook fanpage

Musical groups from The Hague
Instrumental early music groups
Musical groups established in 2009
2009 establishments in the Netherlands